The 2019–20 season was Shrewsbury Town's 134th year in existence and their fifth consecutive season in League One. The club also participated in the FA Cup, the EFL Cup and the EFL Trophy.

The season covered the period from 1 July 2019 to 30 June 2020.

Transfers

Transfers in

Loans in

Loans out

Transfers out

Squad

|-
!colspan=14|Players who left the club:

|}

Pre-season
Shrews announced pre-season friendlies against Aston Villa and Cheltenham Town.

Competitions

League One

League table

Result summary

Results by round

Matches
On Thursday, 20 June 2019, the EFL League One fixtures were revealed.

FA Cup

The first round draw was made on 21 October 2019. The second round draw was made live on 11 November from Chichester City's stadium, Oaklands Park. The third round draw was made live on BBC Two from Etihad Stadium, Micah Richards and Tony Adams conducted the draw. The fourth round draw was made by Alex Scott and David O'Leary on Monday, 6 January.

EFL Cup

The first round draw was made on 20 June.

EFL Trophy

On 9 July 2019, the pre-determined group stage draw was announced with Invited clubs to be drawn on 12 July 2019. The draw for the second round was made on 16 November 2019 live on Sky Sports.

References

Shrewsbury Town
Shrewsbury Town F.C. seasons